Krzyki: is one of the five administrative boroughs (dzielnicas) of Wrocław, Poland. Its functions were largely taken over on 8 March 1990 by the Municipal Office of the newly established Wrocław Municipality. The name, though, remained in use, mainly for statistical and administrative purposes.

It is located in the south of the city. The other boroughs are Fabryczna, Śródmieście, Psie Pole and Stare Miasto.

Krzyki is also the name of one of the settlements within this borough.

Subdivision

The borough is subdivided in the following quarters. In brackets the German names and the year of their incorporation into Wrocław:

 Bieńkowice (Benkwitz/1951),
 Bierdzany (Pirscham/1928),
 Borek (Kleinburg/1897),
 Brochów (Brockau/1951),
 Gaj (Herdain/1904),
 Huby (Huben/1868),
 Jagodno (1951),
 Klecina (Klettendorf/1951),
 Krzyki (Krietern/1928),
 Księże Małe i Wielkie (Klein- und Grosstschansch/1928),
 Lamowice Stare (Alt-Lammerwitz/1951),
 Nowy Dom (Neuhaus/1928),
 Ołtaszyn (Oltaschin/1951),
 Opatowice (Ottwitz/1928),
 Partynice (Hartlieb/1928),
 Południe (1868),
 Przedmieście Oławskie (Ohleviertel/1808),
 Rakowiec (Morgenau/1904),
 Świątniki (Schweitnig/1928),
 Tarnogaj (1904),
 Wilczy Kąt (Wolfswinkel/1808),
 Wojszyce (Woischwitz/1951).

Notable residents
 Prince Heinrich I Reuss of Köstritz (1910–1982)

See also
Districts of Wrocław

References

Districts of Wrocław